Tomentella is a genus of corticioid fungi in the family Thelephoraceae. The genus is ectomycorrhizal, and widespread, with about 80 species according to a 2008 estimate, although many new species have since been described. Tomentella was circumscribed by French mycologist Narcisse Théophile Patouillard in 1887.

Species

T. africana – Benin (West Africa)
T. afrostuposa
T. agbassaensis
T. agereri
Tomentella alpina
T. angulospora
T. asperula
T. atroarenicolor
T. atrovirens
T. aurantiaca
T. badia
T. beaverae – Seychelles
T. brevispina
T. brunneorufa
T. bryophila
T. calcicola
T. carbonaria
T. cinerascens
T. cinereoumbrina
T. clavigera
T. coerulea
T. crinalis
T. donkii
T. duemmeri
T. ellisii
T. epigaea
T. ferruginea
T. ferruginella
T. fibrosa
T. fragilis
T. fraseri
T. fungicola
T. furcata
T. fuscocinerea
T. fuscoferruginosa
T. galzinii
T. gigaspora
T. griseoumbrina
T. griseoviolacea – Canada
T. guadalupensis
T. himalayana – Himalayas
T. hjortstamiana – Seychelles
T. indica – Himalayas
T. intsiae – Seychelles
T. italica
T. juncicola – Benin
T. kentuckiensis
T. kootenaiensis
T. lapida
T. larssoniana – Seychelles
T. lateritia
T. lilacinogrisea
T. maroana
T. microspora
T. molybdaea
T. muricata
T. nitellina
T. oligofibula – Canary Islands
T. olivascens
T. parmastoana – Seychelles
T. pellicularioides – Trinidad
T. phylacteris
T. pilatii
T. pileocystidiata – Seychelles
T. pilosa
T. pisoniae – Seychelles
T. puberula
T. punicea
T. pyrolae
T. radiosa
T. retiruga – Réunion
T. scobinella
T. spinosispora
T. stuposa
T. subalpina
T. subamyloidea – Western Australia
T. subcinerascens
T. subclavigera
T. subcorticioides – Himalayas
T. sublilacina
T. subtestacea
T. subvinosa
T. tedersooi – Seychelles
T. tenuis – Seychelles
T. terrestris
T. testaceogilva
T. umbrinospora
T. variecolor
T. vesiculosa
T. viridescens
T. viridula

References

External links

Thelephorales
Thelephorales genera
Taxa named by Narcisse Théophile Patouillard